Arthur Ziraba (born 8 August 1989) is a Ugandan cricketer. He is a wicketkeeper and has played a first-class and a List A as well as 11 Twenty20 matches for Uganda national cricket team.

References

External links
 

1989 births
Living people
Ugandan cricketers
Cricketers from Kampala
Wicket-keepers